East Cowes is a town and civil parish in the north of the Isle of Wight, on the east bank of the River Medina, next to its west bank neighbour Cowes.

The two towns are connected by the Cowes Floating Bridge, a chain ferry operated by the Isle of Wight Council.

East Cowes is the site of Norris Castle, and Osborne House, the former summer residence of Queen Victoria and Prince Albert. The Prince had a major influence on the architecture of the area, for example on the building of St Mildred's Church in nearby Whippingham, which features distinctive turrets imitating those found on a German castle.

History

The name Estcowe (East Cowes) originally comes from one of two sandbanks each side of the River Medina estuary, so-called after a supposed likeness to cows. The name was subsequently transferred to fortifications built during the reign of Henry VIII on the east bank (East Cowes Castle) to dispel a French invasion, referred to as cowforts or cowes, which subsequently gave the name to the town. The naming of Cowes was done in a similar fashion. They replaced the earlier name of Shamblord.

The settlement of Shamblord at East Cowes was first recorded in 1303. It grew as East Shamblord, and became a much more significant settlement than the Western Shamblord. As the Isle of Wight was the target of frequent French invasions, with some notable incursions, the fort built at East Cowes was later destroyed and should not be confused with the "East Cowes Castle" built subsequently by John Nash.

During the reign of Queen Victoria, who made her summer home at Osborne by acquiring and rebuilding Osborne House, East Cowes was the subject of planned estate of grand houses, groves and parks. The scheme, not finding the finances it needed, was folded, but a few residences built in the early stages still survive to this day such as the former Albert Grove residences of Kent House and Powys House on York Avenue.

In East Cowes Norris Castle was designed in the Norman style by James Wyatt in the late eighteenth century. The building survives and today remains a private home. In 1798, the architect John Nash, began building his home, East Cowes Castle, where he later entertained the Prince Consort and other prominent guests. East Cowes Castle was notable for its Gothic towers and turrets, and elaborate castellation. Nash died in 1835 and is buried in the tower of St James' Church which he also designed. East Cowes Castle was severely damaged by bombing in World War II It was demolished during the 1960s, although the ice house remains and is visible in Sylvan Avenue. East Cowes Urban District Council, which had been based at East Cowes Town Hall, was absorbed into Cowes Urban District Council in 1933.

During World War II, both Cowes and East Cowes became the targets of frequent bombing due to its industry and proximity to Southampton and the Royal Navy's home at Portsmouth. The shipyard of J. Samuel White was badly damaged by air attack in early May 1942 but, when rebuilt, innovative ship construction methods had been introduced. The first warship completed by the renewed yard was HMS Cavalier. During the air raid, the local defences had been fortuitously augmented by the Polish destroyer Blyskawica (itself built by White's), which put up such a determined defence that, in 2002, the crew's courage was honoured by a local commemoration lasting several days to mark the 60th anniversary of the event. Later in 2004, and over to the west, an area of Cowes was named Francki Place in honour of the ship's commander.

To celebrate the Silver Jubilee of the Queen's coronation in 1977, the main hangar doors of what was then the British Hovercraft Corporation (a successor to Saunders Roe) were painted with the world's largest image of the Union Jack, which can still be seen today.

It has since been re-floated, repaired, and returned to service.

Transport

East Cowes is linked to the mainland by Red Funnel’s vehicle ferry service. The Cowes Floating Bridge links East Cowes with Cowes throughout the day. It is a chain ferry, and is one of the few remaining not to be replaced by a physical bridge.

Southern Vectis operate bus route 4 linking the town with Ryde and bus routes route 5 and 25 linking the town with Newport including intermediate villages.

The Isle of Wight Coastal Path runs through East Cowes.

Industry

Local industry in both Cowes and East Cowes has always centred on the building and design of marine craft and materials associated with boatmaking, including the early flying boats, and sailmaking.

East Cowes was also once home to the aircraft manufacturer Saunders Roe, who built the large, advanced, flying boat The Saunders-Roe Princess, as well as the Black Knight rocket and the Black Arrow satellite carrier rocket. They also developed and tested the first hovercraft, the SR.N1.

The former Saunders-Roe factory at Venture Quays now produces wind turbines, which can be seen laid on the quay for shipping out. Due to local objections no wind turbines have been allowed to be erected on the Isle of Wight.

Sport and leisure

East Cowes has a Non-League football club East Cowes Victoria Athletic A.F.C., which plays at Beatrice Avenue. They are also home to FC Bayern Bru who play in the islands Leisure Leagues 6-a-side league at Beatrice Avenue. They won the league title in their inaugural season in the winter of 2013.

Famous residents
Queen Victoria and Prince Albert
 Princess Henry of Battenberg, later known as Princess Beatrice of the United Kingdom, who resided at Osborne Cottage.
Seb Clover (born 1987) – in 2003, Clover set the world record as the youngest cross-Atlantic solo yachtsman, and lived in East Cowes
Sir Christopher Cockerell, inventor of the hovercraft, lived at White Cottage.
Sir George Shedden 
Roscow George Shedden - Colonial bishop of Nassau
John Nash – architect
John Vereker, 6th Viscount Gort - World War II field marshal and commander of the British Expeditionary Force
Lord Mountbatten of Burma (in childhood), later last Viceroy of India at Kent House, East Cowes

Redevelopment Project

The East Cowes Redevelopment Project was set up by SEEDA https://www.iow.gov.uk/azservices/documents/2780-41-08%20Appendix%20A.pdf for the flagship project for the Cowes Waterfront Initiate, which includes redeveloping the town centre of East Cowes. It was intended that such changes would create better employment opportunities and a better environment for residents and visitors alike, providing a unique opportunity to improve East Cowes and create better investment for businesses.

On 6 April 2010, work started on the new Waitrose store on Well Road on the old site of the hovercraft development building. Recruitment for jobs for the new Waitrose Store started during August/September 2010; there were 160 jobs available throughout the store and over 800 people applied.

Part of the redevelopment also included the building of more houses known as "Victoria Walk" and David Wilson was chosen to be the builder. Advertising boards were placed on Old Road in East Cowes with building work commencing soon after.

In 2013, work began to create a new 300 berth marina inside a new breakwater. The plan included a new hotel, restaurant and 100 new homes.

During August 2012, a new Medical Centre opened at Church Path, near Waitrose. The former Medical Centre at Down House (the former home of respected local GP Dr Down), on York Avenue, was closed.

Library
During December 2010, under a cost-cutting plan by the Isle of Wight Council it was decided most local libraries across the Island would close in March 2011, with just Newport and Ryde remaining open. Sandown, Cowes, Ventnor & Freshwater remained open until March 2012, during which time community groups were sought to continue the upkeep and running of the libraries.

East Cowes was one of the libraries set to close in March 2011, but was saved by East Cowes Town Council who appealed for volunteers to continue running the library. It remains at the town centre premises near to the Co-op supermarket, with an outlook to move to newer premises in the near future. Whilst under the Isle of Wight Council ownership it opened around 30 hours a week; this was reduced to around 12 hours per week.

See also
St. James's Church, East Cowes
East Cowes Castle
Frank James Hospital
List of current places of worship on the Isle of Wight

References

External links

 J Samuel White's shipyard - Maritime information on HMS Cavalier.
 The East Cowes Heritage Centre - Local history centre.
 Old postcards of Cowes, Gurnard, East Cowes and Osborne House.
 East Cowes Tourist Information, Accommodation Guide and Photo's.

 
Towns on the Isle of Wight
Ports and harbours of the Isle of Wight
Civil parishes in the Isle of Wight